The 2019–20 season was Crawley Town's 124th season in their history and their fifth consecutive season in League Two. The club finished 13th in League Two, whilst they also competed in the FA Cup, EFL Cup and EFL Trophy, where they were eliminated in the Second round, Fourth round and Group stage respectively. The season covered the period from 1 July 2019 to 30 June 2020.

Season summary
The 2019–20 season saw Crawley Town compete in League Two for the fifth consecutive season. Despite the club reaching the Fourth round of the EFL Cup, their best performance in the competition, manager Gabriele Cioffi left the club by mutual consent on 2 December 2019, with the club having won just once in their previous 11 matches with the club 17th in League Two. Cioffi was replaced by former manager John Yems three days later on a deal until the end of the season. Following an upturn in the club's form, with Crawley losing just 2 of their following 11 matches, Yems' contract was extended until the end of the 2022–23 season in late January 2020. However, in March 2020, the League Two season was postponed due to the COVID-19 pandemic, with Crawley still having a further 9 games to play. The season was later cancelled, with Crawley finishing 13th after clubs agreed to base the final table on points per game.

Players

Players' ages as of 7 March 2020

Transfers

Transfers in

Loans in

Transfers out

Loans out

Pre-season
The Reds have announced pre-season friendlies against Swansea City, Brighton & Hove Albion, Horsham and Portsmouth.

Competitions

League Two

League table

Results summary

Results by matchday

Matches
On Thursday, 20 June 2019, the EFL League Two fixtures were revealed.

FA Cup

The first round draw was made on 21 October 2019. The second round draw was made live on 11 November from Chichester City's stadium, Oaklands Park.

EFL Cup

The first round draw was made on 20 June. The second round draw was made on 13 August 2019 following the conclusion of all but one first round matches. The third round draw was confirmed on 28 August 2019, live on Sky Sports. The draw for the fourth round was made on 25 September 2019.

EFL Trophy

On 9 July 2019, the pre-determined group stage draw was announced with Invited clubs to be drawn on 12 July 2019.

Statistics

Appearances and goals

Top scorers
The list is sorted by shirt number when total goals are equal.

Notes

References

2018-19
Crawley Town